Prompted by Jealousy is a 1913 American silent film drama produced by Hardee Kirkland. The film stars Adrienne Kroell, Lillian Leighton (billed as Lyllian Leighton) and Jack Nelson. The film status is uncertain but a release flier survives which is now at the Margaret Herrick Library at the Academy of Motion Pictures Arts and Sciences, it was part of the Charles G. Clarke collection.

Plot
Laura Venning (Adrienne Kroell), in saving the life of Detective Martin's child wins the friendship of a man of cunning who serves her when she is imperiled through the attentions of an adventuress, who uses here to revenge herself upon Miss Venning's brother. Jack Venning, in a moment of insane wagering, gives a check of $5,000 (approximately 100,000-150,000 as of 2015) to secure a gambling debt. The dashing Jack is admired by Mrs. Romano, a society adventuress with a passion that is not reciprocated and finally turns her fondness to hatred. She overhear's Jack's confession, to his sister, concerning the check and his plea for $5,000 to save him from prison. The hostess of the evening has a pearl necklace of great price that is broken, so she puts it in a crystal jewel box in her boudoir. The wiley and revengeful widow gets the necklace and places it in the vanity bag of Laura. The latter, disconcerted by her brother's story, is about to leave the house when the loss of the necklace is discovered, and Laura is accused of the theft. The officers are called and Mrs. Romano adroitly eggs them on, calling in Martin, the chief of detectives. How he discovers the real thief is one of the cleverest bits of picture work of a play of the time.

Cast
 Adrienne Kroell - Laura Venning, society girl of 19
 Lillian Leighton - Mrs. Martin, Detective's wife (billed as Lyllian Martin)
 Jack Nelson - Jack Venning
 Carl Winterhoff - Ralph Wilson, Laura's fiancé
 Harry Lonsdale - Joe Martin, detective

External links
 

1913 films
1912 drama films
1912 films
American silent short films
1912 short films
Silent American drama films
American black-and-white films
1913 drama films
1910s American films